Lie Lie Live is a digital download EP by System of a Down frontman Serj Tankian exclusively on Rhapsody featuring live tracks, and remixes. There is no known promo release of this EP, however Warner Chappell released a promo sampler containing all the remixes in unmastered form.

Track listing

Personnel

Live tracks
Serj Tankian and Flying Cunts of Chaos (F.C.C):
 Serj Tankian — lead vocals, keyboards, synthesizers
 Mario Pagliarulo — bass, backing vocals
 Erwin Khachikian — keyboards, piano, synthesizers, backing vocals
 Troy Zeigler — drums, backing vocals
 Dan Monti — guitar, backing vocals
 Larry "Ler" LaLonde — guitar, backing vocals

Remixes

 DJ LethalRush — Empty Walls (Victorious Club Mix)
 DJ C-Minus — Sky Is Over (Fawk Yeah Remix)

References
Free Music: Lie Lie Live by Serj Tankian - Rhapsody Online

2008 EPs
Serj Tankian EPs
Serjical Strike Records EPs